BC Rilski Sportist is a Bulgarian professional basketball club based in Samokov. The team is part of NBL, FIBA Europe Cup, and BIBL. They play their home matches at the Arena Samokov, which has a capacity of 3,000 people.

Honours
National Basketball League
Runners-up (2) 2021, 2022
Bulgarian Cup
Winners (4): 2016, 2018, 2021, 2022 
 Runners-up (1): 2010Balkan League 
  Winners (1): 2009
 Runners-up (2): 2011, 2015Bulgarian Basketball Super Cup  Winners (2):''' 2021. 2022
 Runners-up (1): 2016

Season by season

Players

Notable players

 Branko Mirković (2007-2009)
 Aleksandar Radojević (1 year: 2011)
 Nico Carvacho (1 season: 2020–21)

Head coaches
 Aleksandar Todorov (2008–2011)
 Rosen Barchovski (2011–2016)
 Ludmil Hadjisotirov (2016–present)

External links
 Official website 

Basketball teams in Bulgaria
Samokov